Alessandro Golinucci (born 10 October 1994 in San Marino) is a Sammarinese footballer who plays for Virtus and the San Marino national football team.

References

External links 
 at National-Football-Teams
 at Soccerway

San Marino international footballers
1994 births
Sammarinese expatriate footballers
Sammarinese footballers
Living people
Association football midfielders
Campionato Sammarinese di Calcio players
Expatriate footballers in Italy